Dauda Izobo (born 20 June 1980) is a Nigerian amateur boxer.

Career
Izobo qualified for the 2008 Olympics at Light-heavyweight at the 2nd AIBA African 2008 Olympic Qualifying Tournament.

He lost his semi-final to Bastir Samir (4:10), but defeated Domfack Adjoufack to win the third spot.

External links
Qualifier
Dauda Izobo's profile at ESPN Sports

1980 births
Living people
Light-heavyweight boxers
Boxers at the 2008 Summer Olympics
Olympic boxers of Nigeria
Nigerian male boxers